The 2021 Eastleigh Borough Council election took place on 6 May 2021 to elect 12 councillors to Eastleigh Borough Council. Every ward apart from the two member wards of West End North and West End South elected one councillor each. This took place at the same time as the elections for Hampshire County Council and the Hampshire Police and Crime Commissioner.

Results
The Liberal Democrats and Conservatives each gained one seat from each other, meaning that the council composition remained the same.

Results by Ward

Bishopstoke

Botley

 

There was no election in Botley in 2019, so changes are shown from 2018.

Bursledon & Hound North

Chandler's Ford

Eastleigh Central

Eastleigh North

Eastleigh South

Fair Oak & Horton Heath

Hamble & Netley

Hedge End North

Hedge End South

Hiltingbury

By-elections since May 2021

Eastleigh Central

References

2021
Eastleigh
2020s in Hampshire